The 2011 Women's European Union Amateur Boxing Championships were held in the Spodek stadium in Katowice, Poland from June 6 to June 11. This was the 6th edition of this annual competition organised by the European governing body for amateur boxing, the European Boxing Confederation (EUBC). 84 fighters from 20 federations competed in 10 weight divisions.

Host country Poland were convincing victors in the overall medal table, with Turkey and England each winning two golds. Ireland's Katie Taylor won her fourth straight gold in the 60 kg division.

Medal winners

Medal count table

References

2011 Women's European Union Amateur Boxing Championships
2011 Women's European Union Amateur Boxing Championships
Women's European Union Amateur Boxing Championships
International boxing competitions hosted by Poland
European
June 2011 sports events in Europe
21st century in Katowice